On 23 April 2007, Captain Ray Bowyer was flying a routine passenger flight for the civilian airline company, Aurigny Air Services, when he and his passengers gained progressively clearer views of two UFOs during a 12- to 15-minute period. Bowyer had 18 years of flying experience, and the 45-minute flight was one that he had completed every working day for more than 8 years.

Their  journey of 45 minutes took them from Southampton on the southern coast of England, southwestwards to Alderney, being  from France, and the northernmost of the Channel Islands. Their particular flight path had them converging on two enormous, seemingly stationary and identical airborne craft, which emanated brilliant yellow light.

Radar traces also seemed to register the presence of two objects, which Ray Bowyer believed to be correlated with the position and time of the sighting. A study by David Clarke, however, could not establish a definite link, as the radar reflections of cargo or passenger ferries may have affected at least some of the readings. Bowyer disagreed with Clarke's team on the supposed link between the radar traces and ferries, and proposed that two solid airborne craft, which were not and could not have been manufactured on Earth, were working in unison that day, as suggested by the evidence that their sortie was coordinated in both time and space. Captain Patterson, the second pilot witness, posited some type of "atmospheric phenomenon" as explanation.

Prior observations
On 28 January 1994, Pilot Jean-Charles Duboc and his crew observed a large lens-shaped craft over Taverny near Paris during an Airbus A320 flight from Nice to London. The reddish brown craft was observed at a distance of about 50 km for a duration of one minute when it assumed a stationary position at an altitude of 35,000 feet. At Taverny Air Base its presence was confirmed by a 50-second radar track. In retrospect, retired Captain Duboc considered it to have been of a size comparable to that of the Alderney UFOs (perhaps 500 m across), and noted that it was positioned above the latter base, which served as the headquarters of the French Strategic Air Forces Command. At Alderney, the 23 April observation was preceded ten weeks earlier by a sighting of an initial two, and a subsequent 20 to 25 unexplained lights, which appeared in formation over the northern extremity of the island's coastline. These were noticed at 6:15 AM on 14 February by builder Paul Gaudion.

Flight 544
The passengers of flight GR544 departed in a BN2a Mk3 Trislander aircraft registered as G-XTOR at about 2:00 PM in fine weather with good visibility for miles around, though a haze layer was present at 2,000 feet, and a continuous cloud layer at 10,000 feet. At this point he noticed, exactly in the direction of Guernsey, i.e. southwest and twelve o'clock ahead, what appeared to be a brilliant yellow lamp or light. He considered that it might be an aeroplane, or alternatively, reflections from the ground, as Guernsey was immediately behind it. The reflection of the sun off a greenhouse was a possibility but, surprisingly, for a minute and then a couple of minutes, the apparition continued.

Definite shape

He concluded that it was not a reflection but an emission of light. With his binoculars, he could make out a definite shape. The object was long and thin from his viewpoint, and was pointed at each end. The horizontal to vertical dimensions of its body were in a ratio of about 15:1. It was brilliant yellow, with a dark grey band enveloping it one third from the right, like a band around a cigar. With his 10× magnification binoculars, he could make out that it bore no relation to a normal aeroplane. He took his glasses off to exclude the possibility of a reflection from behind.

His reaction was to make contact with Jersey ATC to confirm or exclude the possibility of traffic heading his way. Paul Kelly at Jersey ATC denied the presence of traffic in the said position, but could pick up a faint primary return radar signal, i.e. a signal without the additional transponder return. His instruments were however set to detect only moving objects.

A passenger behind the captain confirmed what he was seeing, and pointed out a second similar craft, immediately behind the first: "Upon nearing the object, a second identical shape appeared beyond the first. Both objects were of a flattened disk shape, with a dark area to [their] right. They were brilliant yellow, with light emanating from within, and I estimated them to be up to possibly a mile across."

Closest proximity
While observing the objects, Bowyer had proceeded well beyond his descent point. At this closest approach the two objects changed their positions and appeared to line up, one directly above the other. A transitory feature of the nearest object now became apparent. At the boundary between its radiant yellow area and the dark grey vertical band, Bowyer believed to perceive a pulsating interface where sparkling blues, greens and other hues were strobing up and down about once a second. Out of concern for the safety of his passengers, he started the descent to the runway and a haze layer obscured their final view of the objects. At no point during the flight however, had there been any interference with the aircraft's systems, instruments or radio communications.

Captain Bowyer relates: "This [was] a big object in the sky, a very, very big object. I did not want to be too close to it and it was at that time that we had to descend to land. We descended through the  haze layer and lost sight of it." ... On Guernsey he related: "There was no hiding it, they were just there. I wasn't too happy. I was quite glad to get on the ground ... and have a cup of tea."

Postflight reporting and reflection

Captain Bowyer produced drawings of the two objects for his CAA Air Safety Report on the day of the sighting, and another in October 2007. Passengers Kate and John Russell, who sat three rows behind captain Bowyer, agreed to submit a report and also went public with their sightings. This knowledge enabled him to construct an estimate of their size (up to a mile long) while on his return flight to Southampton, during which the two objects were nowhere to be seen. Captain Patterson, despite fairly poor visibility, observed one object for about one minute. He described it as yellow/beige in colour, and believed that it pertained to some kind of atmospheric phenomenon.

Ground-based observations
BBC Radio Guernsey reported that two visitors to Sark enquired at their hotel as to what two bright yellow objects in the sky might be. The objects were observed during an afternoon walk on the 23rd, in the direction of Alderney. It is not known whether the radar station near Cap de la Hague, not far from the nuclear reprocessing site, observed any traces. Jersey Airport Radar Control, however, saved a radar recording of the incident, which was submitted to the CAA. They were recorded on Jersey Airport's primary, low-level radar system, but not on the secondary radar used for air traffic control, which was screening out stationary objects.

The decluttered radar traces show two objects with slow movements during a period of 55 minutes. They were moving away from each other at about 6 knots, the first object northwards and towards the Casquets lighthouse, and the second southwards along the coast of Guernsey. They also appeared and disappeared simultaneously on radar, causing captain Bowyer to discount the possibility of them being cargo ferries. Bowyer also pointed out that the track of the northernmost object disappeared from radar after transiting the position of the lighthouse, a region so dangerous to shipping that it would be avoided by any cargo vessel.

National Press Club UFO meeting

Sighting confirmation
Captain Ray Bowyer addressed the US National Press Club on 12 November 2007, and highlighted some details of the sighting.

"Good morning everybody. Thank you for coming this morning. My name is Ray Bowyer and I fly a civilian airliner, as captain. I've been invited here, due to my sighting last April of multiple, as yet unidentified objects, over the Channel Islands region of the English Channel. This encounter lasted for fifteen minutes, and the first object being visible from 55 miles' distance. On nearing the object a second identical shape appeared beyond the first. Both objects were of a flattened disk shape with a dark area to [their] right. They were brilliant yellow, with light emanating from within, and I estimated them to be up to possibly a mile across. I found myself astounded but curious, but at 12 miles' distance these objects were becoming uncomfortably large, and I was glad to descend and land the aircraft. Many of my passengers saw the objects as did the pilots of another aircraft, 25 miles further south. There is also possible radar information still being investigated. A team headed by Dr. David Clarke looking at this case will shortly [...] publish a report but I understand that at this time no definitive solution has been discovered to explain the sighting as yet."

Appeal for transparency
During the address he also highlighted a supposed secrecy and suppression of pilots' UFO sighting reports in the United States.

"I've taken note of some of the differences between the British and the U.S. reporting system. It appears that attitudes on opposite sides of the Atlantic are very different when it comes to the required reporting and recording of this type of event. Air Law stipulates quite clearly that if an operating crew of an aircraft see another aircraft at a place that it shouldn't be, then at the earliest opportunity the whole scenario is to be reported to the relevant authorities.

In my case the British Civil Aviation Authority knew within 20 minutes of the sighting what was seen, as described in a flight log, and faxed directly to the relevant CAA office. The military were informed by Jersey Air Traffic Control at the same time. This is not an option. This is an obligation that crews react in this manner. In my experience, having reported the incident as required has had no negative effect, and there was no problem with me talking about this on British television. Indeed, my company, Aurigny Air Services, have offered every support to [date]. The assistance of Jersey Air Traffic Control in releasing recorded information to myself and the [...] investigating team, has been of great benefit. I did not feel that I was in any danger of being ridiculed, because all I did was to report what actually happened as was my duty as operating aircrew.

I heard about the multiple witness sightings at Chicago O'Hare Airport, about a year ago now, on November the 7th, 2006. I was surprised to hear how it was handled. Despite many pilots and airport personnel witnessing the object hovering over the terminal, there was no investigation at all by the FAA. It appears as if pressure may have been applied to crew members by their company not to discuss this incident. I would have been shocked if I was told that the CAA in the UK would obstruct an investigation, or if the CAA told me that what I had seen was something entirely different. But it seems as if pilots in America are used to this sort of thing here.

I would urge all fellow aircrew to report whatever they see as soon as possible and to stand up and be counted. It is only when crucial and critical witnesses such as air crew make reports that the authorities will be kick-started into a broader investigation of [these] phenomena. Thank you very much."

See also 

List of reported UFO sightings

Notes

References

Alderney UFO sighting
Alderney
Accidents and incidents involving the Britten-Norman Islander
Alleged UFO-related aviation incidents
Alderney UFO sighting
Alderney UFO sighting